The 2014–15 Combined Counties Football League season (known as the 2014–15 Cherry Red Records Combined Counties Football League for sponsorship reasons) was the 37th in the history of the Combined Counties Football League, a football competition in England.

Premier Division

The Premier Division featured five new teams after the promotion of South Park to the Isthmian League, the transfer of Croydon to the Southern Counties East League, the transfer of Wembley to the Spartan South Midlands League, and the relegation of Ash United, Alton Town and Chessington & Hook United to Division One:
Ashford Town, relegated from Southern League Division One Central.
Chertsey Town, relegated from Southern League Division One Central.
Guildford City, relegated from Southern League Division One South & West.
Knaphill, promoted as third-placed club in Division One.
Spelthorne Sports, promoted as champions of Division One.
Eversley & California were initially promoted as runners-up of Division One, but were demoted back there in July 2014 when it emerged that there was a restriction on the use of their floodlights, so the club effectively failed the ground grading requirements. There was no subsequent promotion for fourth-placed Staines Lammas, and no reprieve for relegated Ash United.

The following six clubs applied for promotion to Step 4:
Ashford Town, Camberley Town, Epsom & Ewell, Molesey, Spelthorne Sports and Windsor.

League table

Results

Division One

Division One remained at 16 clubs, and featured three new teams after Spelthorne Sports and Knaphill were promoted to the Premier Division, and South Kilburn left the league:
Ash United, relegated from the Premier Division.
Alton Town, relegated from the Premier Division.
Chessington & Hook United, relegated from the Premier Division.

League table

Results

References
 League tables

External links
 Combined Counties League Official Site

2014-15
9